DC Rainmaker is a blog by Ray Maker that reviews technology used for runners, cyclists, and triathletes. It was started in September 2007.

In the February 2015 web traffic chart of ad-supported bike websites, DC Rainmaker was listed sixth in terms of North American traffic and overall traffic by Bicycle Retailer & Industry News (BRAIN). BRAIN described DC Rainmaker as the "paper of record" for bicycling technology and highlighted his strong ethical independence: Maker does not accept free product or travel from companies, nor does he accept advertising from them. However DC Rainmaker does earn money from links provided to the products on Amazon and receives products in beta stage  from companies.

Maker lives in Amsterdam and is from Seattle, Washington.

Maker was listed in Runner's World as one of "The 50 Most Influential People In Running".

References

External links

Running mass media
Cycling websites
American sport websites